Colt Nichols (born March 22, 1994) in Muskogee, Oklahoma is an American motorcycle racer who competes in the AMA Supercross and Motocross Championships.

Career
Nichols races in the 250cc East Championship in AMA Supercross. His greatest career achievement to date was winning the 2021 title in this racing class for Yamaha.

References

1994 births
Living people
American motorcycle racers